Zsófia Gubacsi was the defending champion, but lost in the quarterfinals to Gisela Dulko.

Patricia Wartusch won the title by defeating Klára Koukalová 5–7, 6–3, 6–3 in the final.

Seeds

Draw

Finals

Top half

Bottom half

References

External links
 Official results archive (ITF)
 Official results archive (WTA)

2002 WTA Tour
Morocco Open
2002 in Moroccan tennis